Nikhil Raj Murugesh Kumar (born 12 January 2001) is an Indian professional footballer who plays as a forward for Kickstart in the Bangalore Super Division and I-League 2.

Club career 
Born in Bengaluru, Karnataka, Nikhil Raj made his senior debut with Indian Super League side Odisha.

Indian Arrows 
In 2020, Nikhil Raj was loaned from Kickstart FC to Indian Arrows. On 26 January 2020, Nikhil made his debut for I- League side Indian Arrows against Real Kashmir. He played entire 90 minutes of the game, as they lost by 2–0.

Odisha 
On 22 May 2020, Nikhil Raj joined Indian Super League club Odisha FC. On 5 December 2021, Nikhil made his debut for against Kerala Blasters and scored a goal in injury time. The match ended in a 1–2 victory for Kerala Blasters.

References

2001 births
Living people
Association football forwards
Odisha FC players
Footballers from Bangalore
Indian footballers
India youth international footballers